Mező is a Hungarian surname. Notable people with this surname include:

Béla Mező (1883–1954), Hungarian track and field athlete
Ferenc Mező (1885–1961), Hungarian poet
Mihály Mező (born 1978), Hungarian singer and musician

Hungarian-language surnames